The Battle of Ginnis (also known as the Battle of Gennis) was a minor battle of the Mahdist War that was fought on December 30, 1885, between soldiers of the Anglo-Egyptian Army and Mahdist Sudanese warriors of the Dervish State. The battle was caused by the Mahdist blockade of the Ginnis-Kosha Fort, which British commanders hoped to relieve.

The fighting resulted in a British victory that is principally remarkable as the last battle that was certainly fought by the British Army in red coats, although a Maxim battery from the Connaught Rangers may have fought in red at the Battle of Ferkeh in 1896.

Background

Situation 
In 1884, a Sudanese Islamic religious leader, Muhammad Ahmed, also known as "The Mahdi", planned and executed a series of attacks that left a British general, William Hicks, and thousands of ill-trained Egyptian soldiers dead at the hands of angry Arab rebels called Dervishes or, more accurately, Mahdists. The Sudan was controlled by an Anglo-Egyptian administration. After it was decided that something must be done, General Charles Gordon was sent by the British government to be the Egyptian Army's Governor-General there. Gordon and his aide, Colonel John Donald Hamill Stewart, carried orders from both governments to evacuate the town from the Mahdi. Instead, Gordon built up the town's defenses and prepared for a siege. The British government sent two relief columns, the slow River Column and the mobile Desert Column, to rescue Gordon, Stewart and the Egyptian garrison. After both columns won hard-fought battles in Kirbekan and Abu Klea, respectively, Stewart was found to have been murdered by wandering Arabs north of Khartoum after his steamboat ran aground, and the treachery of an Egyptian deputy commander had allowed Khartoum to have been fallen. Gordon was killed, and the columns retreated, leaving behind a series of forts.

One of the forts was near the towns of Kosha and Ginnis, in northern Sudan, where a detachment of Cameron Highlanders and Egyptian-Sudanese troops from the Ninth Sudanese Battalion were stationed. Thousands of Mahdist warriors, led by their provincial amirs, began raiding in the vicinity of Ginnis. They besieged the fort, the garrison's Gardner gun was once dismounted by a Mahdist artillery barrage. General Evelyn Wood, the British commander in Egypt and the sirdar (commander) of the Egyptian Army, became concerned about the siege and the raids and ordered Major General Francis Grenfell, with a force of two infantry brigades and a cavalry brigade, to rid the area of Mahdists.

Grenfell's force 
The First Brigade consisted of the First Berkshires, the West Kent Regiment, the Second Durham Light Infantry, an Egyptian artillery battery escorted by 60 Egyptian troops and a Royal Engineer detachment. The brigade was commanded by Brigadier General Butler. Colonel Huyshe's Second Brigade was composed of the Yorkshire Regiment, six companies of the Cameron Highlanders, 152 Sudanese soldiers, 278 men of the 1st Egyptian Battalion, a mule battery of the Royal Artillery and detachments from both the British Camel Corps and its Egyptian counterpart. Three Gardner guns were also brought along by the Second Brigade. The cavalry brigade, led by Colonel Blake, was formed by another detachment of the Egyptian Camel Corps, a British Mounted Infantry company and 57 Egyptian cavalrymen. Some of the British troops were dressed in scarlet coats, but the Durham Light Infantry had left their red coats in Cairo before they headed south and were wearing khaki. The Egyptians were dressed in white or khaki. Some Egyptian officers preferred their traditional blue coat. British soldiers and officers wore white sun helmets, and the Egyptians wore red fezes.

Battle

Opening clashes 
At 5:00 on the morning of December 30, 1885, General Grenfell and his troops marched out of their bivouack, which was between the Ginnis-Kosha fort and a smaller fort further south on the Nile. The First Brigade was at the head of the column, and the Camel Corps and Second Brigade followed. The Second Brigade took up positions overlooking Kosha, and the fort garrison, seizing the opportunity, sortied and stormed the town. On the Nile, the steamer Lotus, which had mounted a Gardner gun, reported that a large body of Dervishes was moving out of Ginnis in the direction of Grenfell's column. The Camerons and Sudanese, followed by the Second Brigade and covered by the Lotus, moved to investigate and counter the threat.

Main battle 
As the Second Brigade fought through the palm groves near Ginnis, Dervish riflemen fired several volleys at the First Brigade. Although the firing was inaccurate, the smoke that it created allowed spearmen to surprise the Camel Corps. In the ensuing skirmish, that detachment was forced to withdraw, but the Durham Light Infantry moved forward and repulsed the Dervish attack.

As the First Brigade prepared to attack the main Dervish camp near Ginnis, the Second Brigade entered the town itself. Fighting its way through the streets, it took control of it. Nearby, the First Brigade's attack forced the Dervishes to retreat from their camp and pull back into the Atab Defile. Grenfell then ordered Colonel Blake's cavalry brigade to dislodge the Arabs in the Defile. After the Mounted Infantry took the Atab Defile with a bayonet charge, a general pursuit began, but Blake halted his men and the Dervishes fled to the desert.

As the First Egyptian Battalion marched through Kosha, the men noticed that some Dervishes, probably seeking shelter during the retreat from the town, had holed up, with their weapons, in a house. With a screw gun from the Mule Battery covering them, the Egyptians stormed the house. That encounter marked the end of the battle.

Aftermath 
The Anglo-Egyptian victory at Ginnis effectively ended the First Sudan Campaign and the first third of the Mahdist War, which had begun with the destruction of an Egyptian force near Fashoda in 1881. A few more campaigns, mainly defensive or relief operations, were fought until a large Anglo-Egyptian army, commanded by both Sirdar Sir Herbert Kitchener, a former intelligence officer, and General Sir Reginald Wingate reconquered the Sudan in a massive campaign from 1896 to 1898. Most Mahdist resistance ended in the large-scale Battle of Omdurman in 1898.

References 

Savage and Soldier Online
Queen Victoria's Little Wars by Byron Farwell

External links 
 Egypt 1882 - 1885. Sudan 1896-97 Lieutenant John Frederick Soltau - 1st Bn Berkshire Regiment

1885 in Sudan
Battles of the Mahdist War
Battles involving the United Kingdom
Battles involving Sudan
Conflicts in 1885
December 1885 events